Mridula Mandhatasinh Jadeja (born 6 January 1991) is a Gujarati cricketer. She played for Saurashtra and West zone. She has played 1 First-class matches, 46 Limited over matches and 36 Women's Twenty20.

References 

1991 births
Saurashtra women cricketers
West Zone women cricketers
Living people